Satellite is an American alternative rock band from Los Angeles, California, and Nashville, Tennessee, formed by Steven McMorran, Josh Dunahoo, and Mitch Allan in June 2010.

History
Satellite was formed around songs written by lead singer, Steven McMorran and produced by Mitch Allan with Josh Dunahoo.

Starting in early 2009, they were eager to invest themselves into music that felt permanent and worked diligently to make a records that would be a worthy reminder of the passion they required.

The collaboration project was official announced in June 2010, under the name of Satellite, with band members including McMorran, Allan, Dunahoo and drummer Justin Glasco, who later left the band as a sought after producer. In 2011, Erik Kertes joined the band as the new bassist to allow McMorran to switch to guitar.

The band released its first EP Ring the Bells on July 24, 2010. The EP being a mix of mellow alternative rock and power pop, with influences such as Paul Simon, Bruce Springsteen, Radiohead, and Snow Patrol. The EP has been critically acclaimed by Radar Online, Alternative Press, Kings of A&R, and The LA Examiner. The band supported the release of the EP with a music video for the first single "Say the Words" and some dates performing live around the Los Angeles area, with their first date as a full band being on August 14, 2010, at the Saint Rocke in Hermosa Beach. Satellite recently completed its forthcoming debut album, Calling-Birds, set to be released February 2013 on Descendant Records/Sony Music Entertainment.

Frontman Steven McMorran has a creative history of collaborating with everyone from Weezer's Rivers Cuomo to Joe Cocker and Every Avenue. McMorran recently collaborated with Cuomo on his English-Japanese self-titled LP called, Scott & Rivers. McMorran co-wrote the first track, "Break Free", stating, "The best part about that experience was seeing how he built this story that we sort of outlined together... and I got to hear the word 'perambulations' fit perfectly into a verse."

Band members

Steven McMorran - lead vocals, guitar (2010–present)

Press
 CBS Last.FM Live @ Rockwood Hall – Teaser for “Brooklyn”: http://originals.last.fm/live-in-nyc/satellite-sneak-peek-brooklyn/
 MSN VIDEO — Bing Lounge Performance for Kink Radio Portland
 I’m On Fire: http://video.us.msn.com/watch/video/satellite-i-m-on-fire/1l3ck0e6a
 Brooklyn: http://video.us.msn.com/watch/video/satellite-brooklyn/1l3fvcwjw?cpkey=531e37da-cfc1-4859-82c0-7eaa905ec9c1%257c%257c%257c%257c
 Interview: http://video.us.msn.com/watch/video/satellite-live-interview-on-kink-fm/1l3087hsl?cpkey=531e37da-cfc1-4859-82c0-7eaa905ec9c1%257c%257c%257c%257c
 ARTISTdirect - “Turning On My Own” video premiere
 http://www.artistdirect.com/entertainment-news/article/video-premiere-satellite-turning-on-my-own/10565350
 NME Magazine - “Turning On My Own” video placement
 https://www.nme.com/musicvideos/satellite-turning-on-my-own/1895345
Press Quotes:
 "Lead singer and chief songwriter Steven McMorran is a modern-day pop music philosopher.- CBS/last.fm
 "Calling Birds, an album that can best be described as an indie-inspired slice of Americana" -Huffington Post, A-Side Series
 "Satellite's Steven McMorran eases between cowboy craggy and a keening falsetto, sounding like Bon Iver after a strenuous season of rustling cattle or maybe just wearing a lot of denim." - MTV Buzzworthy
 "Americana, indie rock and singer-songwriter styles all come to mind. Poetic and dramatic, "Brooklyn" bridges the gap between all of those genres. The seductive melody reminds me of Chris Isaak while the pulsating energy wouldn't feel out of place in the alternative world. Rather than grumbling and yelling, though, frontman Steven McMorran possesses a dynamic voice that conveys a sense of urgency."- CMT Edge
 "With a sound like One Republic on steroids, these guys are poised to capture the pop charts this year." - Examiner LA

Discography
Ring the Bells (2010)
Calling-Birds (2013)

References

External links
Official website
Satellite at Facebook
 Satellite at YouTube
 Satellite at Instagram
 Satellite at Twitter

Musical groups established in 2010
2010 establishments in the United States